The House of Seven Colors is a Sesame Street book teaching color recognition. It was published in 1985 as part of the Sesame Street Book Club series from Western Publishing. It was written by Madeline Sunshine and illustrated by Tom Cooke. The title is a play on Nathaniel Hawthorne's novel The House of Seven Gables. The book was republished in 1992.

Plot
Count von Count and other Muppets are returning from a country drive in the Countmobile. But, in classic suspense/horror movie fashion, the bridge is out, so the group has to spend the night at a spooky old house. A giant monster butler escorts each character to a room, decorated entirely in one of the seven colors of the rainbow. No one is especially gruntled by their accommodations: Cookie Monster is distracted by the delicious green shade of everything in his room, while the Count knows in advance he won't be able to sleep in his room, due to all the red things in it to count, Ernie is disgusted with his purple room, Oscar the Grouch finds himself trapped in a bright pink room, filled with flowers and hearts, while Bert longs for a beige room over an orange one, Betty Lou is blinded by yellow, and even Grover finds himself depressed by his matching blue room. The group rapidly depart the next morning, happy to leave the weird house and return. The Sesame Street residents are unaware that the House of Seven Colors is in fact a tourist attraction, frequented by vast car and busloads of monsters who feel right at home in rooms that match their fur.

External links

Sesame Street books
1985 children's books